Manohar Das, also Manohar or Manuhar, (active 1582–1624) was an Indian Hindu painter in the Mughal style.

Manohar's father Basawan was a master painter in the Mughal emperor's court, where Manohar grew up. His father most likely instructed him, and later Manohar became a court painter as well. His earliest works were painted for Akbar, and then later he was in the service of Akbar's son and successor Jahangir. Manohar's works frequently depicted the royal families and life at court. Some of his works can be found at the British Museum and the Victoria and Albert Museum.

References

Further reading
 (see index: p. 148-152; plate 13)
The Emperors' album: images of Mughal India, an exhibition catalog from The Metropolitan Museum of Art (fully available online as PDF), which contains material on Manohar Das

16th-century Indian painters
Year of death unknown
Year of birth unknown
Mughal painters
17th-century Indian painters
Indian male painters